Barney's Version may refer to:

 Barney's Version (novel), a 1997 novel written by Canadian author Mordecai Richler
 Barney's Version (film), a 2010 film based on the novel